Vital signs are basic measures of life and good health frequently examined in medicine.

Vital signs may also refer to:

Music
 Vital Signs (band), a pop band from Pakistan
 Vital Signs (Survivor album), 1984
 Vital Signs (White Heart album), 1984
 "Vital Signs" (Rush song), 1981
 "Vital Signs" (Frank Turner song), 2006
 "Vital Signs", a song on the album The Crystal Axis by the Midnight Juggernauts

Other uses in arts, entertainment, and media
 Vital Signs (1990 film), an American film directed by Marisa Silver
 Vital Signs (2009 film), a Canadian film directed by Sophie Deraspe 
 Vital Signs (novel), a 1991 novel by Robin Cook
 Vital Signs (TV series), a British television show